The Israel Innovation Authority (IIA) is the support arm of the Israeli government, charged with fostering the development of industrial research and development in the State of Israel. Until 2016, the IIA was known as the Office of the Chief Scientist (OCS) of Israel's Ministry of Economy.
 
A variety of ongoing support programs offered by the Authority provide financial and developmental resources for entrepreneurs and companies of all sizes and stages performing industrial R&D within Israel. Funds and support programs include: The R&D Fund, the Incubator Program, Tnufa Program (Ideation), Technology Transfer (Magneton) Program and Applied Research in Academia (Nofar, Kamin) Program.

The Authority is also responsible for Iserd management within the European Union Framework, as well as international R&D agreements and partnerships with countries such as USA, Canada, Japan, South Korea, Singapore and more. 

The Israel Innovation Authority offices are located in the Jerusalem Technology Park, in the Malha neighborhood in Jerusalem.

History

The Office of the Chief Scientist was established in 1965. It was renamed the Israel Innovation Authority in 2016. The main aim of the Authority is to increase economic empowerment within the civilian sector of the Israeli economy. Main activities include the funding of R&D and policy-making within its sphere of influence. The development and prominence of the OCS was further strengthened by the development of the venture capital industry within Israel in the 1990s.

The mission of the Authority has been defined through the country's "Law for the Encouragement of Industrial Research and Development—1984" (The R&D Law) and its operations are facilitated through Israel's R&D Fund, as well as a variety of international programs, agreements and collaborations. Its mission is to assist the advancement of Israel's knowledge-based science and technology industries in order to encourage innovation and entrepreneurship while stimulating economic growth.

Legal aspects of agreements which may include R&D funding, as well as royalties, are governed under the Regulatory Framework of the Authority.

According to the Israel Innovation Authority, 54 percent of Israel's exports are high-tech products and services.

Programs

Technological incubators
The Technological Incubators Incentive Program was established in 1991 and is designed for entrepreneurs, interested in establishing a startup company based on an innovative technological concept.  In addition to funding, the technological incubator offers a supportive framework for the establishment of a company and development of a concept into a commercial product, providing technological, business and administrative support. Incubators are selected through competitive processes for a license period of up to five years and are spread across Israel in sectors such as Medical Devices, Pharma, Bioconvergence, Agricultural technology, Foodtech, Renewable Energy and more. In any time, there are about 20 active incubators in Israel. Startups in the Incubators Program typically receive grants of up to 5 million Shekels, with govermnant funding of between 70% to 85%.

Magnet
The Magnet Program was established in 1994, and manages the partnership between academic and commercial R&D programs. Significant activities include facilitation of the transfer of knowledge between academia and commercial R&D companies. Under the auspices of the Magnet Program, the NOFAR program was established to provide support and funding in the field of biotechnology, nanotechnology and development of medical equipment.

Chief scientists and CEOs

The following is a list of Chief Scientists of the Ministry of Economy (1965-2016).

The following is a list of CEOs of the Israel Innovation Authority (since 2016).

References

External links
 Israel Innovation Authority (English)
 Israel Innovation Authority (Hebrew)

Government agencies of Israel
Science and technology in Israel
Research_and_development_organizations